Bernard or Barend Fokke, sometimes known as Barend Fockesz, was a 17th-century Frisian-born captain for the Dutch East India Company. He was renowned for the uncanny speed of his trips from the Dutch Republic to Java. For example, in 1678 he traveled the distance in 3 months and 4 (or 10) days, delivering governor Rijckloff van Goens a stack of letters from which the traveling time could be confirmed. In later times a statue was erected of him on the small island Kuipertje, near the harbor of Batavia. The statue was destroyed by the English in 1808.

His fast trips caused people to suspect that he was aided by the Devil, and he is often considered to have been a model for the legendary captain of the Flying Dutchman, a ghostly ship doomed to sail the seas forever.

References
Notes

Bibliography

17th-century births
Year of death uncertain
Dutch sailors
Sea captains
People from Friesland
Dutch folklore
Flying Dutchman
Frisians
Deal with the Devil
Maritime folklore